The Flag Football World Championship was created in 2002 in Cancun, Mexico, with six countries. In its 11th annual event, the 2010 World Cup of Flag Football Festival took place in Boston in July.

In 2001, the championships were held in Toronto, Canada, and played host to eight countries. The winner was Australia's team the "Roo Boys" captained by Brendan Neighbour.

The 2014 tournament was held in Jerusalem.

References

American football competitions
Flag football

2. https://ffwct.com/